Code page 1116 (also known as CP 1116 or IBM 01116) is a code page used under DOS to write the Estonian language. It is a modification of code page 850.

Character set
The following table shows code page 1116. Each character appears with its equivalent Unicode code-point. Only the second half of the table (code points 128–255) is shown, the first half (code points 0–127) being the same as code page 850.

References

1116